Purple hat therapy is a hypothetical medical practice in which an established form of therapy is mixed with an unlikely novel addition (such as wearing a purple hat) and then is claimed to be effective because of the novel addition, when in fact the effectiveness is due to the established component.

Origin and description 
The term "purple hat therapy" was coined by Gerald Rosen and Gerald Davison in their 2003 paper, Psychology should list empirically supported principles of change (ESPs) and not credential trademarked therapies or other treatment packages. The therapy is accepted as effective because it is assessed overall; the additional element of the "purple hat" is not tested as distinct and does not need to prove its extra worth. Its invention is followed by the publication of papers discussing it and special training courses.

Application 
Purple hat therapy has been used as an analogue for Eye movement desensitization and reprocessing‎ since it takes established exposure therapy and adds non-science based activities such as eye movement as a "purple hat".

See also 
 Fallacy of composition

References

Sources

Further reading 

 

Metaphors